Don't Cheat in Our Hometown is the sixth studio album by American country music artist Ricky Skaggs. It was released in 1983 via Epic Records. The album peaked at number 1 on the Billboard Top Country Albums chart. It features guitar work from Albert Lee on five of the album's ten tracks and Dolly Parton harmonizes vocals on "A Vision Of Mother" and "Don't Step Over an Old Love".

Track listing
"Don't Cheat in Our Hometown" (Ray Pennington, Roy Marcum) – 3:17
"Honey (Open That Door)" (Mel Tillis) – 3:28
"A Wound Time Can't Erase" (Bill D. Johnson) – 3:40
"A Vision of Mother" (Carter Stanley, Ralph Stanley) – 3:19
"Uncle Pen" (Bill Monroe) – 2:23
"Head Over Heels in Love with You" (Lester Flatt) – 3:41
"Don't Step Over an Old Love" (Fred Stryker) – 3:34
"She's More to Be Pitied" (Ruby Rakes) – 2:48
"Keep a Memory" (C. Stanley) – 2:36
"Children, Go Where I Send Thee" (Traditional) – 2:25

Personnel 
 Ricky Skaggs – lead vocals, acoustic guitar, backing vocals (1, 2, 8, 9), fiddle (1, 4, 7-9), harmony vocals (3-5, 7), mandolin (4, 7, 9), arrangements (10)
 Glen Hardin – piano (1, 2, 7, 8)
 Buck White – piano fills (2, 3), piano solo (2), bass vocals (10)
 Mickey Merrit – piano (3, 5)
 Albert Lee – electric guitar (1, 7, 8), electric lead guitar (2, 6), piano (6)
 Ray Flacke – electric guitar (3, 5)
 Brian Ahern – S-400 guitar (4, 9), acoustic guitar (6), electric guitar (6)
 Hank DeVito – steel guitar (1, 7, 8), electric rhythm guitar (2)
 Bruce Bouton – steel guitar (3, 5)
 Lou Reid – banjo (5), harmony vocals (5)
 Marc Pruett – banjo (9)
 Jerry Douglas – dobro (9)
 Emory Gordy, Jr. – bass guitar (1, 2, 4, 6-9)
 Jesse Chambers – bass guitar (3, 5)
 John Ware – drums (1, 2, 6-8)
 George Grantham – drums (3, 5)
 Bobby Hicks – fiddle (3, 5)
 Bobby Hardin – backing vocals (2)
 Cheryl White-Warren – backing vocals (2), harmony vocals (10)
 Sharon White-Skaggs – backing vocals (2), harmony vocals (10)
 Dolly Parton – harmony vocals (4, 7)

Production 
 Ricky Skaggs – producer 
 Donivan Cowart – engineer 
 Marshall Morgan – engineer, mixing 
 Steve Scruggs – engineer
 Hollis Halford – assistant engineer 
 Pat McMakin – assistant engineer 
 Glenn Meadows – mastering at Masterfonics (Nashville, Tennessee)
 Virginia Team – art direction 
 Jeff Morris – design 
 Jim "Señior" McGuire – photography 
 Chip Peay Enterprises – management

Chart performance

References

1983 albums
Ricky Skaggs albums
Epic Records albums
Albums produced by Ricky Skaggs